Andrew Thomas Maginnity (1849 – 12 March 1918) was a member of the New Zealand Legislative Council from 14 July 1914 to 12 March 1918, when he died. He was appointed by the Reform Government.

He was from Nelson.

References 

1849 births
1918 deaths
Members of the New Zealand Legislative Council
Reform Party (New Zealand) MLCs